Bloodline is the third album by Recoil, released April 14, 1992. It was recorded at Konk Studio in London, during sessions that lasted from January to March 1991, being mixed later that same year. The album was produced by Alan Wilder, engineered by Steve Lyon, and assisted by Dave Eringa.

After completing Depeche Mode's most successful album, Violator, and subsequent "World Violation Tour" (with Nitzer Ebb as the support act), Wilder co-produced Nitzer's 1991 album Ebbhead.  This cemented both a good personal and working relationship with Nitzer lead singer Douglas McCarthy. After completing the Nitzer Ebb album, Wilder went to work on his solo project, and McCarthy returned the favor by performing on the Recoil album.

Wilder recruited guest vocalists for the first time: Moby, Toni Halliday (from Curve), and Douglas McCarthy, helping produce a significant move forward. It also marked the first Recoil single, a cover of the Alex Harvey song "Faith Healer".

The album is also notable for the track "Electro Blues for Bukka White", which introduced the idea of taking very old recordings and setting them in a new electronic setting.  Moby, who contributed vocals for the song "Curse", would later release his 1999 breakthrough album, Play, which arguably contains clear stylistic similarities to “Electro Blues for Bukka White”. On Play, Moby used several old field recordings by Alan Lomax, much as Wilder had used a 1937 recording of White's "Shake 'Em on Down”.

Track listing 
All music written by Alan Wilder except "Faith Healer" (Alex Harvey and Hugh McKenna)

 "Faith Healer" (vocals: Douglas McCarthy)
 "Electro Blues for Bukka White" (vocals: Bukka White)
 "The Defector" (instrumental)
 "Edge to Life" (vocals: Toni Halliday)
 "Curse" (vocals: Moby)
 "Bloodline" (vocals: Toni Halliday)
 "Freeze" (instrumental)

Credits and personnel 

 Alan Wilder – production, instruments
 Douglas McCarthy – lead vocals on "Faith Healer"
 Toni Halliday – lead vocals on "Edge to Life" and "Bloodline"
 Moby – rap on "Curse"
 Bukka White – vocals taken from the track "Shake 'Em on Down" and used for "Electro Blues for Bukka White"
 Diamanda Galás – vocals  on "Curse"
 Jimmy Hughes – bass guitar on "Edge to Life"
 Steve Lyon – engineering
 Aaron Trinder – guitar on "Faith Healer"
 Dave Eringa – engineering assistant
 Martin Atkins, T + CP Associates – sleeve photography and design

 Diamanda Galás contribution is unexplained in the credits, but she is mentioned as appearing on the album. The coda to "Curse" contains a backmasked sample from "The Lord Is My Shepherd" (Psalm 23) from You Must Be Certain of the Devil.
 In the short interlude between "Electro Blues for Bukka White" and "The Defector", there's a piano sample from the end of David Bowie's "Aladdin Sane".
 Samples of Anthony Hopkins' voice from The Silence of the Lambs are used throughout "The Defector".
 In "Edge to Life", the end of Ippolita's monologue from Depeche Mode's Strange can be heard twice.
 An interpretation (or slowed down sample) of "Laura Palmer's Theme" from Twin Peaks is featured in the instrumental interlude in "Bloodline".
 "The Defector" is Alan's tribute to one of his favorite bands, Kraftwerk.

Single

"Faith Healer"

7" (MUTE 110) (UK) 
 "Faith Healer (LP Version)" – Mixed by Wilder and Lyon
 "Faith Healer (Healed Mix)" – Remixed by LFO

12" and CD (12 MUTE 110 / CD MUTE 110) (UK) 
 "Faith Healer (LP Version)" – Mixed by Wilder and Lyon
 "Faith Healer (Trance Mix)" – Mixed by Wilder and Lyon
 "Faith Healer (Conspiracy Theory)" – Remixed by Daniel Miller and Philipp Erb, Engineered by Mike Bigwood
 "Faith Healer (Disbeliever Mix)" – Remixed by LFO
 "Faith Healer (Deformity)" – Mixed by Wilder and Lyon
 "Faith Healer (Barracuda Mix)" – Additional production and mix by Moby (Listed as Richard Hall)
 "Faith Healer (Conspiracy (Double Bullet) Theory)" – Remixed by Miller and Erb, Engineered by Bigwood

Notes 

1992 debut albums
Mute Records albums
Recoil (band) albums
Sire Records albums